8D Technologies was a Canadian company that developed bicycle-sharing systems and automated parking management systems. It merged with Motivate in 2017.

History

Early years

8D Technologies was founded in Montreal, Quebec, Canada, in 1996, by CTO Jean-Sébastien Bettez. Initially a professional services firm, the company shifted its focus towards the product market in 2000 when Jean-Sébastien's sister, Isabelle Bettez, joined 8D and became its CEO.

Stationnement de Montréal
In 2002, 8D Technologies, along with partner Cale Systems, was selected by Société en commandite Stationnement de Montréal (SCSM), Montreal's parking authority, to provide an automated parking management system for the city. 8D provided the technological platform (terminal computers, network technology, software platform) while Cale manufactured the terminals. The new pay by space system would replace Montreal's thousands of aging mechanical parking meters. The new system, consisting of solar-powered payment terminals that wirelessly process payments in real-time, was programmed in Java on a Linux platform. After successfully testing the platform in 2003, notably with regards to Montreal's cold winters, SCSM started to deploy terminals on the streets of Montreal in 2004.

BIXI
When the city of Montreal decided to implement a bicycle sharing system in 2007, it mandated SCSM to carry out the project. SCSM created the not-for-profit organization Société de vélo en libre-service (SVLS) to operate the BIXI bike share system. Building on the success of the wireless payment solution that equipped SCSM's automated parking system, 8D Technologies provided the technological platform for the BIXI program, including the wireless solar-powered bike station terminals, the RFID bike dock technology and all software systems. Over the next 2 years, BIXI would rapidly expand by selling the 8D-powered bike share system to cities around the world: Melbourne in May 2010 (Melbourne Bike Share), Minneapolis in June 2010 (Nice Ride Minnesota), London in July 2010 (Barclays Cycle Hire), Washington, D.C. in August 2010 (Capital Bikeshare) and Boston in July 2011 (Hubway).

Dispute with SVLS
In January 2012, SVLS informed 8D Technologies that it would stop using the 8D platform, accusing 8D of overbilling for its technology. According to a Radio-Canada report, the decision to unilaterally cut ties with 8D Technologies was taken more than six months earlier, in June 2011, by the SLVS board of directors. Instead of using the 8D software, SVLS would develop its own platform through American firm Personica Intelligence. The decision would effectively prevent 8D from participating in future Bixi installations, such as the planned expansions in Chattanooga and New York City. 8D would however continue to be the technology supplier for the existing BIXI-based systems. In April of the same year, 8D Technologies filed a lawsuit, seeking $26 million in damages from SVLS. SVLS in turn sued 8D for $2 million shortly after.

SVLS bankruptcy
The software developed by SVLS to replace the 8D system experienced problems early on in Chattanooga, Chicago, and New York. On July 20, 2012, New York City Mayor Michael Bloomberg declared that delays in the launch of New York's bike-share program were caused by software problems. The Citi Bike program finally launched 10 months later, in May 2013, but still experienced technical difficulties. As a result, New York and Chicago withheld payments to SVLS. Mired in financial problems, SVLS sought protection under the Bankruptcy and Insolvency Act on January 20, 2014.

Post-BIXI
Less than a month after BIXI declared bankruptcy, 8D Technologies formed a partnership with Alta Bicycle Share (now Motivate), the company that operated most of the bike share programs running systems sold by BIXI. This newly formed alliance between two former SVLS partners was selected by Seattle to replace the bankrupt entity as the supplier for the planned bike share program in the city. Seattle's Pronto Cycle Share was eventually launched in October 2014, becoming the first deployment of 8D Technologies' BSSv4 bike share system, for which 8D manufactured the entire solution (docking stations and terminals), in addition to providing the software platform. December 2014 marked 8D's first foray into Asia, with the launch of ADBC Bikeshare in Abu Dhabi.

Citi Bike
Prior to the Seattle system launch in Fall 2014, 8D's BSSv4 system was initially tested in Brooklyn, New York, for the Citi Bike program. These tests paved the way for the replacement of SVLS' buggy software for Citi Bike by the 8D system, which took place in March 2015. 8D Technologies also replaced docking technology and bike station embedded systems. It was also announced that Citi Bike would add 92 new BSSv4 bike stations. This first expansion for the two-year-old program took place in August 2015.

Merger 
On February 9, 2017, 8D Technologies announced that it was merging with Motivate, with Jay Walder serving as the CEO of the combined companies.

Locations

Bike share systems

Current locations
These are bike share systems that are currently operating using the 8D Technologies platform.

Former locations

Automated parking management

Current location

Technology

Cloud9
Cloud9 is a Java-based operating environment introduced by 8D in 2001. It was presented at the Consumer Electronics Show in 2002. This proprietary platform equips embedded units in parking and bike share terminals produced by 8D.

8D ECO Unit 
The ECO device is a Linux-based embedded system unit that is the core of 8D's terminals. It is an integrated unit developed by 8D to provide secure wireless communications, real-time electronic payment management, components control and power management to point-of-sales terminals. The ECO module also allows remote control of terminals. It was initially deployed in 2003 on the first automated parking management terminals installed in Montreal. ECO stands for electronic commerce.

Bike Key Dispensing Unit
In 2014, 8D Technologies developed the world's first bike key dispensing terminal, which was installed for the program Nice Ride Minnesota in September of that year. The bike key dispenser enables users to purchase a bike key directly at a terminal instead of receiving it in the mail. 8D bike key dispensers have since been installed in every North American city bike share program powered by 8D, as well as in Abu Dhabi

References

External links 
 Official website 

Bicycle sharing companies
1996 establishments in Quebec
Companies based in Montreal
Technology companies of Canada